Dave Cash , born Ludwik Slomniker in 1910 in Lemberg, then Austria was a French Yiddish-language comedian, composer, musician and entertainer. He was famous in the Yiddish theater for his song parodies. He was the owner and the main performer of a Yiddish-language cabaret in Pigalle, that had an otherwise typical program for a French cabaret. Several of his humorous songs and stand-up routines were rereleased in Israel in 2004 under the name An Evening with Dave Cash ( ערב עם דייב קאש  ). In 2015, the Institut Européen des Musiques Juives (European Institute for Jewish Musics) released a set of six CDs including some of his great hits. Dave Cash died in 1981 in Cannes, French Riviera. His wife, Jadwiga Podstolska, died in 2001.

Discography

Der Shere fun Seville
A'fallen die Blettin
Tzures mit Hula Hoop
Yiddish Lieder Parade
Ich dank dir Gott as ich hob es nicht
Dave Cash Presente Ses Fantaisies Yiddish (Avec Didier Boland et Son Orchestre) (released 1956)
An Evening With Dave Cash (Compilation CD release 2004)

References

Romanian Ashkenazi Jews
French Ashkenazi Jews
Yiddish comedians
Jewish French comedians
1910 births
1981 deaths
Polish emigrants to France
Yiddish-language satirists